Tortilia flavella is a species of moth in the Stathmopodidae family. It is found in Spain, North Africa and in the Near East (Syria and Israel).

The wingspan is 9–11 mm. Adults have been recorded from May to September. There are probably two generations per year.

Larvae have been recorded on flowers and fruit of Acacia species and on last years dried fruits of Punica granatum.

References

External links
 Lepiforum e. V.

Stathmopodidae